The Angel of the Crows is a 2020 fantasy novel written by the American author Sarah Monette under the pseudonym Katherine Addison. It is set in an alternate 19th century London, with supernatural creatures such as angels and is based on the Sherlock Holmes stories.

Base works
A review on Tor.com describes the novel as a Sherlock fan fiction, with wings, with the main character made likable.

Locus notes the novel is an anthology, based on A Study in Scarlet, The Sign of the Four, The Hound of the Baskervilles.

Reception
The novel has been described as a fresh taking on Sherlock Holmes, "full of juicy supernatural surprises and kind, thoughtful characterization". Reviewers note the lack of originality to the plots, as the crimes adhere closely to the original Sherlock Holmes works.

References

2020 American novels
American fantasy novels
2020 fantasy novels
Sherlock Holmes pastiches
Tor Books books